Bozhou District, formerly Zunyi County, is a district of the city of Zunyi, Guizhou, China.

Education
Secondary schools in Bozhou District include:

 Zunyi City Bozhou District New People's Secondary School
 Zunyi City Bozhou District Baizhen Houba Secondary School

 Zunyi City No. 53 Secondary School
 Zunyi City Bozhou District Hongguan Miao Township Heyan School
 Zunyi City Bozhou District Shangji Secondary School
 Zunyi City Bozhou District Yaxi Secondary School
 Zunyi City Bozhou District Nanfeng School
 Zunyi City Nanbai Secondary School
 Zunyi City Bozhou District Tuanxi Secondary School
 Zunyi City No. 21 Secondary School
 Zunyi City No. 22 Secondary School
 Zunyi city No. 23 Secondary School

References 

County-level divisions of Guizhou
Zunyi